is a passenger railway station in the city of Takasaki, Gunma, Japan, operated by the private railway operator Jōshin Dentetsu.

Lines

Station layout
The station consists of a single island platform connected to the station building by a level crossing.

Platforms

Adjacent stations

History
Yamana Station opened on 5 May 1897.

Surrounding area
Takasaki Yamana Post Office
Site of Yamana Castle
Yamana Hachiman-gu

See also
 List of railway stations in Japan

External links

 Jōshin Dentetsu 
  Burari-Gunma 

Railway stations in Gunma Prefecture
Railway stations in Japan opened in 1897
Takasaki, Gunma